Verje is a settlement on the left bank of the Sava River at Medvode in the Upper Carniola region of Slovenia.

References

External links

Verje on Geopedia

Populated places in the Municipality of Medvode